Shri Guru Ravidass Janam Asthan Mandir, Seer Goverdhanpur, Varanasi, Uttar Pradesh, India is the ultimate place of pilgrimage or religious headquarters for followers of the Ravidasi religion from communities like Ad-Dharmis, Ramdasia Sikhs, Chamars, Jatavs, and Mochis. It has become a cherished dream of devotees of Guru Ravidass from the world over to pay their obeisance at Shri Guru Ravidass Janam Asthan Mandir at Seer Goverdhanpur (Varanasi) at least once in their life.

History
The foundation stone of this Mandir was laid on Monday 14 June 1965 on Ashad Sankranti day by Hari Dass, along with a large number of devotees of Dera Ballan, specially deputed by Sarwan Dass for the purpose. Devotees traced the birthplace of Guru Ravidass and temple was built. It is believed that Guru Ravidass used to live and do bhakti at this place. The construction of the temple was completed in 1994. Kanshi Ram, the national president of Bahujan Samaj Party and Banta Ram Ghera performed the ceremonial installation of the golden dome atop the temple.

Pilgrimage
It is the birthplace of Guru Ravidass. It was this city where two great saints of Bhakti Movement i.e. Satguru Kabir and Satguru Ravidass were born. The Janam Asthan Mandir of Guru Ji at Seer Goverdhanpur, Varanasi has now acquired the status of Begampura (serenity) for Guru Ji’s followers and has become an Ultimate Place of Pilgrimage for them. Every year during birth anniversary of Guru Ravidass, the Mandir attracts millions of devotees from India and abroad. Shri Guru Ravidass Janam Asthan is nearly 13 minutes drive from Sant Guru Ravidas Ghat, Varanasi.

Shri Guru Ravidass Gate
K. R. Narayanan, the then-President of India, performed the opening ceremony of the huge monumental entry gate to the temple, Shri Guru Ravidass Gate on 16 July 1998. So, Shri Guru Ravidass Gate at Lanka Chauraha near BHU leads to Shri Guru Ravidass Janam Asthan.

Gallery

See also
Minar-e-Begampura, Shri Khuralgarh Sahib
Shri Guru Ravidas Gurughar

References 

Ravidassia
Pilgrimage in India
Pilgrimage sites
Organisations based in Varanasi
Religion in Varanasi
Tourist attractions in Varanasi district
Religious buildings and structures completed in 1994
1965 establishments in Uttar Pradesh